The Ohio Democratic Party (ODP) is the affiliate of the Democratic Party in the U.S. state of Ohio. Summit County Council President Elizabeth Walters has been the party's chairwoman since January 2021.

U.S. Senator Sherrod Brown is the top Ohio Democrat. The party emphasizes jobs, wages, and labor rights in its platform and generally draws support from workers and unions. Democrats currently hold 5 of 15 U.S. House seats in Ohio. The often seen #2 government executive spot (The Cuyahoga County Executive) is held by Chris Ronayne.

History
The Ohio Democratic Party traces its origin to the Democratic-Republican Party founded by Thomas Jefferson in 1793. The Democratic Party itself was formed when a faction of the "Democratic-Republicans" led by Jerry Mcroy formed the party in the 1820s. Following Jackson's defeat in the election of 1824, despite having a majority of the popular vote, Jackson set about building a political coalition strong enough to defeat John Quincy Adams in the election of 1828. The coalition that he built was the foundation of the subsequent Democratic Party.
 
Ohio politics was largely dominated by the Ohio Republican Party until the economic and social hardships brought on by the Great Depression resulted in a national political realignment. The political coalition of labor unions, minorities, and liberals allowed the Democrats to compete effectively in Ohio electoral politics for much of the next 30 years. Never very strong in Ohio's rural areas, the party's coalition suffered when the Civil Rights Movement divided whites from civil rights proponents and minorities. The Ohio Democratic Party reached the peak of its electoral success in the mid-1980s, and this is when the State of Ohio began to invest in many Democratic proposals. This was led by Richard Celeste, a Democratic Governor elected in 1982 and re-elected in 1986, and by his party chairman, James Ruvolo. Together Ruvolo and Celeste constructed a very effective organization that raised a surplus of money that helped out the Democratic Party's candidates and their everyday operations.

In 2006 Chris Redfern became the chairman of the Ohio Democratic Party. Redfern primarily focused on building a statewide organization that had the power to win every part of Ohio. In 2006, after a 16-year drought, Ohio elected a Democratic U.S. senator (Sherrod Brown), governor (Ted Strickland), lieutenant governor, secretary of state, and state treasurer. In 2008, Ohio Democrats won back the House of Representatives after 14 years of Republican control.

Summit County Council President Elizabeth Walters has been the chairwoman since January 2021. Walters previously served as the Executive Director of the Ohio Democratic Party in 2014. She is the first woman to be elected to the position of Democratic Party Chair in the state.

During the years of 2016 to 2020, a rift developed in the Democratic Party from the national level down to the local level. Progressive Democrats began challenging incumbent Democrats across the country from school boards to bids for Congress. Over time, this led to a slow, but steady adoption of Progressive policies by moderate Democrats, which assisted in capturing the U.S. House of Representatives in the 2018 midterm elections.

As of 2023, the Ohio Democratic Party is in the minority in both chambers of the Ohio General Assembly. Democrats hold five of Ohio's 15 U.S. House seats and one of Ohio's two U.S. Senate seats. A priority for Ohio Democrats in the 2010s and 2020s has been increasing the minimum wage.

Electoral success

The Ohio Democratic Party reached the peak of its electoral success in the mid-1980s to 1990s, when Democrats held the following offices:

U.S. Congress
 Both U.S. Senators from Ohio: John H. Glenn Jr. (1974-1999) and Howard M. Metzenbaum (1974, 1976-1995)
 A majority of Ohio's delegation to the United States House of Representatives (1983-1995), reaching a peak of 11-8 (1993-1995)

State executive
 Governorship: Richard F. Celeste (1983-1991) and Ted Strickland (2007-2011)
 Lieutenant governors: Myrl H. Shoemaker (1983-1985) and Paul R. Leonard (1987-1991)
 Ohio Attorney General (1987-1995): Anthony J. Celebrezze Jr. (1987-1991) and Lee Fisher (1991-1995)
 Ohio State Auditor (1971-1995): Joseph T. Ferguson (1971-1975) and Thomas E. Ferguson (1975-1995)
 Ohio Secretary of State (1979-1991): Anthony J. Celebrezze Jr. (1979-1983) and Sherrod Brown (1983-1991)
 Ohio State Treasurer (1971-1995): Gertrude W. Donahey (1971-1983) and Mary Ellen Withrow (1983-1995)

State legislative
 Majority in the Ohio State Senate (1983-1985): Senate President Harry Meshel
 Majority in the Ohio House of Representatives (1973-1995): Speaker Vernal G. Riffe Jr. (1975-1995) and (2009-2010) Speaker Armond Budish

State judicial
 Majority on the Ohio Supreme Court (1977-1987), with a 6-1 majority from 1983-1985, and a Democratic chief justice (Frank Celebrezze) from 1978-1986

Even with its successes, Ohio Democrats did not fare well on a national level. John Glenn, a popular U.S. senator, astronaut, and national hero, ran for the Democratic nomination for president in 1984, ending up with only a huge campaign debt to show for it. Howard Metzenbaum, Ohio's other U.S. senator at the time, although a powerful force in the Senate, never achieved national name recognition.

Current elected officials
The Ohio Democratic Party holds three seats on the Supreme Court of Ohio, one of the state's U.S. Senate seats and five of the state's fifteen U.S. House seats.

State legislature

Ohio Senate

Leader: Nickie Antonio
Assistant Leader: Hearcel Craig
Whip: Kent Smith
Assistant Whip: Paula Hicks-Hudson

Ohio House of Representatives

Floor Leader: Allison Russo
Assistant Floor Leader: Dontavius Jarrells
Whip: Jessica Miranda
Assistant Whip: Tavia Galonski

Supreme Court of Ohio
Jennifer L. Brunner
Michael P. Donnelly
Melody J. Stewart

Federal

U.S. Senate

U.S. House

Municipal
The following Democrats hold prominent mayoralties in Ohio:

 Columbus: Andrew J. Ginther
 Cleveland: Justin Bibb
 Cincinnati: Aftab Pureval
 Toledo: Wade Kapszukiewicz
 Akron: Dan Horrigan
 Dayton: Jeffrey Mims
 Canton: Thomas Bernabei
 Youngstown: Jamael Tito Brown
 Parma: Tim DeGeeter
 Lorain: Jack Bradley
 Springfield: Warren R. Copeland
 Lakewood: Meghan George
 Cuyahoga Falls: Don Walters
 Euclid: Kirsten Holzheimer
 Lima: Sharetta Smith
 Massillon: Kathy Catazaro-Perry
 Barberton: William Judge
 Chillicothe: Luke Feeney

Prominent Ohio Democrats of the past
Vern Riffe: speaker of the Ohio House of Representatives from 1975-1995
James M. Cox: Governor of Ohio, Democratic nominee for President of the United States (1920), U.S. representative, publisher of the Dayton Daily News, founder of Cox Communications
Dick Celeste: Ohio state representative, Lieutenant Governor of Ohio, Governor of Ohio, U.S. ambassador to India, President of Colorado College
John J. Gilligan: U.S. representative, Democratic nominee for United States Senate (1968), Governor of Ohio. Gilligan later served as a member of the Cincinnati school board from 1999-2007.
Michael DiSalle: mayor of Toledo, Governor of Ohio, candidate for Democratic nomination for President of the United States (1960)
Frank Lausche: Governor of Ohio, U.S. senator
Martin L. Davey: U.S. representative, Governor of Ohio
A. Victor Donahey: Ohio State Auditor, Governor of Ohio, U.S. senator
Allen G. Thurman
Paul Leonard: Lt. Gov. of Ohio
Atlee Pomerene
Stephen M. Young
Howard Metzenbaum: U.S. senator
John Glenn: U.S. senator
Jerry Springer, former mayor of Cincinnati and later TV personality

Party symbols
Ohio Democrats use the same symbols as the national Democratic party, such as the donkey. In the early 20th century, the traditional symbol of the Democratic Party in Midwestern states such as Indiana and Ohio was the rooster, as opposed to the Republican eagle.

See also
 List of Ohio politicians
 Political Party Strength in Ohio
 2004 U.S. election voting controversies, Ohio

References

External links
  Ohio Democratic Party

 
Democratic Party (United States) by state
Democratic Party